Television City, alternatively CBS Television City, is an American television studio complex located in the Fairfax District of Los Angeles at 7800 Beverly Boulevard, at the corner of Fairfax Avenue. Designed by architect William Pereira and Charles Luckman, Television City opened in 1952 as the second CBS television studio complex in Southern California, following CBS Studio Center in the Studio City section of the San Fernando Valley, which continues to house additional production facilities and the network's Los Angeles local television operations (KCBS-TV and KCAL-TV). Since 1961, Television City has served as the master control facility for CBS's west coast television network operations which were previously based at CBS Columbia Square. In 2018, CBS sold Television City to the real estate investment company Hackman Capital Partners while continuing to exclusively lease its space.

Since its opening, numerous TV shows have been broadcast live or recorded at Television City, including many shows not aired on CBS. It has also been the production site of several films such as the 1996 feature That Thing You Do!, starring Tom Hanks and Liv Tyler. During the opening credits of many of the shows recorded here, a voice-over announced the phrase "from Television City in Hollywood". The complex currently houses a total of eight separate studios. The facility infrequently conducts backstage tours led by a CBS page.

History 
CBS planned to move most of its entertainment operations to the Los Angeles area in 1950. As they needed additional space beyond its Columbia Square complex on Sunset Boulevard, CBS purchased the property at Fairfax Avenue and Beverly Boulevard that year. Hiring architect William Pereira, the company reportedly spent $7 million on the studio. Television City opened on November 16, 1952. It was built on the site of a former football field and race track, Gilmore Stadium. Before the stadium, it was an oil field.

Initially, the four original studios were equipped with RCA TK-10 monochrome cameras. Studio 43 was equipped with RCA TK-40/41 color cameras in 1954, with cables allowing any of the original four studios to use those cameras. In 1956, Studio 41 was equipped with RCA TK-41s. However, CBS color broadcasts decreased in frequency until the following decade, when the 1964 production of Rodgers and Hammerstein's Cinderella was recorded—the last known use of the RCA color cameras. CBS programs were, in general, in black-and-white until Norelco PC-60 color cameras were installed starting in late 1964.

Studio 33 is the current home of the long-running CBS game show The Price Is Right and the HBO late night talk show Real Time with Bill Maher. This soundstage was also the home of The Carol Burnett Show for its entire 1967–1978 run, and The Red Skelton Show prior to that (1953–1970), as well as the notable game shows Match Game (the 1973–82 Gene Rayburn-hosted version, and the 1998 version), The $25,000/$100,000 Pyramid (the 1980s run), Hollywood Squares (hosted by Tom Bergeron), Wheel of Fortune from 1989 to 1995, the 1986–1989 revival of Card Sharks, the 1983–86 version of Press Your Luck, and the 1988–1995 run of Family Feud. During the April 9, 1998, episode of The Price Is Right (which was commemorated as its 5000th episode), CBS dedicated Studio 33 the Bob Barker Studio in honor of the show's longtime host and executive producer.

When it became standard for sitcoms to tape in front of a studio audience in the 1970s, many shows were recorded on soundstages at Television City, such as All in the Family, Maude, and Good Times. The ABC sitcoms Three's Company and Welcome Back, Kotter were also taped at Television City.

CBS Television City is also home to CBS's visual effects studio, CBS Digital, and the CBS Records music label. "Television City" is a registered trademark of CBS for its TV production facilities.

In September 2017, CBS investigated selling the property due to a development boom in the Fairfax District. As a result of this possibility, the city of Los Angeles is taking steps (as of May 2018) to officially declare the facility a historic and cultural monument. CBS Corp. sold Television City to Los Angeles real estate investment company Hackman Capital Partners for $750 million in a deal finalized in mid-December 2018. The deal gives the buyer the right to use the Television City name. CBS programs produced at Television City, including The Price Is Right, The Young and the Restless, The Bold and the Beautiful, and The Late Late Show with James Corden, will continue to be based at Television City, as well as the headquarters of the CBS international unit.

Architecture 
The stark modern architecture at Television City consists of black and white planes meeting at razor-sharp corners, with accents of dazzling red, the work of Pereira & Luckman of Los Angeles. The studio facility was built to handle the larger production needs for the network, most of which took place at the rather cramped CBS Columbia Square. The building's black and white color scheme was also used to identify areas where it was designed to be expanded. Black walls and glass walls indicated "temporary" structure that could be removed during expansion, while white areas were "permanent".

The building initially held four soundstages (Studios 31, 33, 41, and 43), but a renovation in the late 1980s added two new soundstages to the east of the original building (Studios 36 and 46), plus additional office/storage space and technical facilities. Later, another renovation further added two more studios (Studios 56 and 58) in what had been rehearsal halls in the original building. The original plans for Television City called for 24 soundstages, before CBS executives decided to settle with just the initial four.

In 2021, Hackman announced plans for a major, $1.25 billion redevelopment of the facility, which will expand Television City to at least 15 soundstages, and add additional office space. Parts of the expansion will be built atop existing parking lots, which will be converted to parking garages. The four original studios and its architectural qualities will be preserved. In March 2023, due to the redevelopment, Fremantle announced that The Price is Right would relocate to a new facility in Glendale after having filmed at Television City for 51 consecutive seasons. Other programs currently filmed at Television City will also relocate elsewhere; The Late Late Show with James Corden was already scheduled to end entirely in April 2023.

Shows produced at Television City 
Below is a partial list of programs that have recorded episodes or broadcast live at Television City Studios.

 The $10,000/25,000/100,000 Pyramid
 Alice (pilot episode only)
 All in the Family
 Amateur's Guide to Love
 American Idol (2002–2016, 2018–present)
 America's Got Talent (2009–2011)
 Archie Bunker's Place
 Are You Smarter than a 5th Grader? (2008–2009, 2015)
 Art Linkletter's House Party
 Beat Shazam
 Beat the Clock
 Blackout
 The Bold and the Beautiful
 Body Language
 Bullseye
 The Burns and Allen Show
 Can You Top This?
 Capitol
 Card Sharks (1986–1989, 2019)
 The Carol Burnett Show
 Cher
 Cherries Wild
 Child's Play
 Climax!
 Contraption
 Crosswits
 Dancing with the Stars
 The Danny Kaye Show
 Deal or No Deal (2005)
 Dennis Miller Live
 Dinah!
 Dirty Rotten Cheater
 Don Adams' Screen Test
 Don't Forget the Lyrics! (2007–2009)
 Double Dare (1976–77)
 The Edsel Show
 Family Feud (1988–95, 1999–2000)
 Celebrity Family Feud (2015–present)
 Follow the Leader (TV series)
 The Game Game
 Game Show in My Head
 Game Show Moments Gone Bananas
 Gambit
 Gameshow Marathon
 Give-n-Take
 The Gong Show
 Good Times
 High Rollers
 The Hollywood Game
 Hollywood Squares (1998–2004)
 Hollywood's Talking
 I've Got a Secret
 Insight
 The Jack Benny Program
 The Jeffersons
 The Joker's Wild
 The Judy Garland Show
 Kids Say the Darndest Things
 The Larry Elder Show
 The Late Late Show (1995–present)
 ... with Tom Snyder (1995–1999)
 ... with Craig Kilborn (1999–2004)
 ... with Craig Ferguson (2005–2014)
 ... with James Corden (2015–present)
 The Lawrence Welk Show (1977–79)
 The Masked Singer (2019-2020)
 Live to Dance (2011)
 Love Connection (2017–2018)
 Mama's Family
 Match Game
 Matchmaker
 Maude
 Me and the Boys
 Meet Millie
 The Merv Griffin Show
 The Mike Douglas Show
 The Montel Williams Show
 Morris Cerullo Help Line
 My Friend Irma
 Now You See It
 One Day at a Time (1975–1984)
 Osbournes Reloaded (2008–2009)
 Password
 The Pat Sajak Show
 Pet Star
 Pictionary
 Playboy After Dark
 Playhouse 90
 Politically Incorrect
 Press Your Luck (1983–1986, 2019–2020, 2022)
 The Price Is Right (1972–2023)
 Real Time with Bill Maher
 The Red Skelton Show
 Rock Star: INXS/Supernova
 Rodeo Drive
 The Ropers
 The Roseanne Show
 Rove LA
 Show Me the Money (2006)
 Skating with the Stars (2010)
 Slide Show
 The Smothers Brothers Comedy Hour
 So You Think You Can Dance (2005–present)
 The Sonny & Cher Comedy Hour
 Spin-Off
 The Steve Harvey Show
 Stockard Channing in Just Friends
 Stump the Stars
 Survivor (finales and reunions)
 Talking Bad
 Talking Dead
 Talking Preacher
 Talking Saul
 Tattletales
 That's My Line
 That's My Mama
 There's One in Every Family
 Three's Company
 Tic-Tac-Dough
 Tony Orlando and Dawn
 To Tell the Truth
 The Twilight Zone
 3rd Degree
 The Tyra Banks Show (2005–2007)
 Vibe
 Video Village
 Welcome Back, Kotter
 Wheel of Fortune (1989–1995)
 Whew!
 Wild 'n Out
 Win, Lose or Draw
 The World's Best
 The X Factor (2011—2013)
 Xuxa
 The Young and the Restless
 You Don't Know Jack

References 
Citations

Works cited

External links 
 

Buildings and structures in Los Angeles
Television City
Landmarks in Los Angeles
Modernist architecture in California
Television studios in the United States
William Pereira buildings
Fairfax, Los Angeles
The Late Late Show (American talk show)
Buildings and structures completed in 1952
1952 establishments in California